The Ted Knight Show is an American sitcom television series starring Ted Knight which centers on the owner of an escort service in New York City. The series aired on CBS from April 8, 1978 to May 13, 1978.

The series was a spin-off of Busting Loose and was one of two series Knight starred in that bore his name; in 1986 his sitcom Too Close for Comfort was retitled The Ted Knight Show after a significant retooling.

Cast
 Ted Knight as Roger Dennis
 Normann Burton as Burt Dennis
 Thomas Leopold as Winston Dennis
 Iris Adrian as Dottie
 Cissy Colpitts as Graziella
 Fawne Harriman as Honey
 Ellen Regan as Irma
 Tanya Boyd as Philadelphia Phil Brown
 Janice Kent as Cheryl
 Deborah Harmon as Joy
 Claude Stroud as Hobart Nalven

Synopsis
Suave, divorced, middle-aged Roger Dennis is the owner of Mr. Dennis Escort Service, a high-class escort service located in a fancy Manhattan apartment building in New York City. He hovers over the attractive young women – the air-headed Graziella; Honey, who has a "take-charge" personality; the timid Irma; Phil, who is the companys only African American escort; Cheryl, a floozy; and Joy – who serve as the escorts for his service. His brother Burt, a tyrannical, no-nonsense businessman, financed the company and is his business partner. Burt hired his wisecracking wife Dottie as the companys secretary; she answers the office telephone with "Mr. Dennis Escorts! Wherever you want to go, we want to go with you!" Rogers college-age son Winston is trying to break into the escort business, but is easily distracted and constantly makes passes at the women who work for Roger, and Roger feels that he lacks maturity and self-control. Hobart Nalven is the mailman who has a crush on Dottie.

Production
The Ted Knight Show was Ted Knights first attempt at starring in a show of his own after his run from 1970 to 1977 as newsman Ted Baxter on The Mary Tyler Moore Show. After its pilot, "Mr. Dennis Steps Out, " was broadcast on October 26, 1977, as the fifth episode of the second season of the sitcom Busting Loose, The Ted Knight Show was spun off as its own series in the spring of 1978. A disappointment, The Ted Knight Show drew low ratings and was cancelled after six weeks on the air. Episode director Joel Zwick later said that in his opinion CBS had thought that Knights star power would carry the show, but that the premise of a situation comedy centering on an escort service was too strange for the show to succeed. Knight, meanwhile, said that in retrospect it had been a mistake for him to star in a new show so soon after the conclusion of The Mary Tyler Moore Show.

Lowell Ganz and Mark Rothman created the show, which CBS broadcast on Saturday at 8:30 p.m. throughout its brief run. It was filmed in color before a live studio audience at Paramount Studios in Hollywood, California.

Episodes

Pilot (1977)

Season 1 (1978)

References

External links
 
 The Ted Knight Show opening credits on YouTube

CBS original programming
1978 American television series debuts
1978 American television series endings
1970s American sitcoms
1970s American workplace comedy television series
American television spin-offs
English-language television shows
Television shows set in New York City
Television series by CBS Studios